Karen Louise Chhour (born  ) is a New Zealand politician who was elected to the New Zealand parliament at the 2020 general election as a representative of the ACT New Zealand party.

Early life and career
Chhour is of Māori descent and belongs to the Ngāpuhi iwi. She was born in Australia and moved to New Zealand as a baby, first living with her grandparents in Kaeo before moving back in with her mother on the North Shore at the age of 5. She regularly ran away from home and ended up in foster care, which she states as a reason for her interest in addressing homelessness and child poverty. She worked in property management prior to becoming involved in politics.

Political career

Chhour came fourth in Upper Harbour. However, ACT won 8% of the party vote, which entitled it to 10 MPs including Chhour. Chhour is ACT's spokesperson for Social Development, Children, and Child Poverty Reduction.

In early December 2021, Chhour in her capacity as ACT's health spokesperson criticised the Labour Government's plans to introduce legislation under its Smokefree 2025 programme that would ban anyone under the age of 14 from legally purchasing tobacco for the rest of their lives. Older generations will only be permitted to buy tobacco products with very low-levels of nicotine while fewer shops will be allowed to sell tobacco products.  Chhour argued that prohibition was unworkable and that the new law would create a black market for tobacco products.

On 28 September 2022, Chhour in her capacity as ACT's children spokesperson questioned the Minister of Children Kelvin Davis about the relationship between Oranga Tamariki (the Ministry for Children) and the Māori group Te Whānau o Waipareira Trust, which was being investigated for financing Māori Party candidate John Tamihere's campaign during the 2020 New Zealand general election. In response, Davis had made a statement telling Chhour  to "enter the Māori world and stop looking at the world through a "vanilla lens." Chhour, who is Māori, was offended by his remarks, stating that Davis had taken away her mana. In response, ACT Party leader David Seymour described Davis' comments as "nasty" and "totally racist." The following day, Davis contacted Chhour and apologised for his remarks. Chhour accepted his apology. That same week, Chhour had introduced a member's bill that proposed repealing Section 7AA of the Oranga Tamariki Act 1989, which requires Oranga Tamariki's chief executive to recognise and commit to the principles of the Treaty of Waitangi.

Personal life
Chhour lives on the North Shore. She met her husband Menglin, a Cambodian refugee, in intermediate school. They lost touch when she moved schools, but reconnected when she was 16, working at McDonald's after dropping out of high school. They have four children together.

In 2020, Chhour reconnected with her long-lost Australian father and discovered she has two sisters.

References

1980s births
Living people
ACT New Zealand MPs
Members of the New Zealand House of Representatives
New Zealand list MPs
New Zealand people of Australian descent
New Zealand Māori women
Māori MPs
Year of birth missing (living people)